Peter Osuský (born 11 October 1953 in Bratislava) is a Slovak politician, serving as the  member of the National Council. In addition to being a MP, he is also a councilor in the Bratislava Old Town council, university professor and physician. Osuský is active as a co-editor of the Encyclopaedia Beliana. 

Osuský was born to an intellectual Lutheran family. His grandfather was a bishop and theology professor. He studied Medicine at the Comenius University, graduating in 1977. Following the graduation and compulsory military service, Osuský worked as a physician and university professor.

In the early 1990s, Osuský joined the Democratic Party. Between 1994-2001 served in the leadership of the party. In 1998 Slovak parliamentary election, ha gained a seat on the Slovak Democratic Coalition list.

When the  Democratic Partymerged with the Slovak Democratic and Christian Union – Democratic Party, he left and co-founded the Civic Conservative Party, which he led between 2001 and 2011. In 2010, the party candidates ran on the Most–Híd list and Osuský  was again elected to parliament.  

In 2012, Osuský joined the Freedom and Solidarity party in rebelling against government support for European Stability Mechanism. Later that year, he left the Civic Conservative Party and became a Freedom and Solidarity member. In the 2012 Slovak parliamentary election, he again gained a seat in the National Council. Since then, has been a part of the Freedom and Solidarity caucus.

In 2014, Osuský became Freedom and Solidarity candidate in the 2014 Slovak presidential election. Nonetheless, shortly before election he withdrew his candidacy and endorsed Radoslav Procházka. 

Osuský is married to a fellow doctor and has four children.

References

Freedom and Solidarity politicians
Slovak Democratic Coalition politicians
Living people
1953 births
Civic Conservative Party (Slovakia) politicians
Democratic Party (Slovakia, 1989) politicians
Politicians from Bratislava
People from Bratislava
Members of the National Council (Slovakia) 1998-2002
Members of the National Council (Slovakia) 2010-2012
Members of the National Council (Slovakia) 2012-2016
Members of the National Council (Slovakia) 2016-2020
Members of the National Council (Slovakia) 2020-present
Comenius University alumni
Academic staff of Comenius University
Candidates for President of Slovakia
20th-century Slovak physicians
21st-century Slovak physicians